The International Documentary Film Festival Docville is an annual documentary film festival set in Leuven, Belgium.

Docville was founded in 2005 as a thematical series within the arthouse movie theatre Cinema ZED. In the next edition the festival added competitive sections and became independent of the movie theatre.  Docville takes place each year in different locations within the city of Leuven. It is the only annual, competitive documentary-only film festival in Belgium. 
In June 2018 the festival announced it is one of 28 film festivals in the world whose jury award-winning film will be placed on the longlist of the documentary feature category for the Academy Awards

The 16th edition was postponed due to the COVID-19 crisis (original dates: March 25 to April 2, 2020) to September 25 - October 3, 2020.
The 17th edition is postponed  due to the COVID-19 crisis to June 9-19th 2021.
The 19th edition is planned between March 22-30th 2023. In 2023 a new section was added to the festival, dedicated to science related documentaries and activities: ScienceVille.

Programming 
The festival has three main competitions: Jury award for best Belgian documentary, Jury award for best international documentary and Jury award for best documentary within the ConScience competition. Next to these recurring section, the festival has each year a selection of non-competitive programming, which vary each year.

The festival focuses on auteur driven documentaries: documentaries that reflect the director's personal creative vision with regards to cinematography, content, structure, productional context, ...

Awards 
1st edition Docville (September 28 - October 3, 2005)

No awards

2nd edition Docville (September 27 - October 3, 2006)
 Best Belgian documentary: Rwanda, Les Collines Parlent (director: Bernard Bellefroid)
 Best international documentary: Last Supper (Sweden, directors Mats Bigert & Lars Bergström)

3rd edition Docville (May 30 - June 5, 2007)
 Best Belgian documentary: Het Rijksadministratief Centrum (director: Yves Cantraine)
 Best international documentary:  The Monastery: Mr. Vig and the Nun (Denemarken, regie: Pernille Rose Grønkjær)

4th edition Docville (May 10–17, 2008)
 Best Belgian documentary: Le Flic, La Juge et L'assassin (director: Yves Hinant)
 Best international documentary: Stranded (France, director: Gonzalo Arijon)

5th edition Docville (May 2–9, 2009)
 Best Belgian documentary: Zondag Gaat Het Gebeuren (director: Joeri Vlekken)
 Best international documentary: Dear Zachary (USA, director: Kurt Kuenne)

6th edition Docville (May 1–8, 2010)
 Best Belgian documentary: Vlasman (director: Jan Lapeire)
 Best international documentary: How Much Does Your Building Weigh, Mr Foster? (Spain, directors: Norberto López Amado, Carlos Carcas)

7th edition Docville (April 29 - May 7, 2011)
 Best Belgian documentary: L'Ile Déserte (director: Steve Thielemans)
 Best international documentary: Marwencol (USA, director: Jeff Malmberg)
 ConScience award: Rainmakers (The Netherlands, director: Floris-Jan Van Luyn)

8th edition Docville (April 27 - May 5, 2012)
 Best Belgian documentary: Empire of Dust (director: Bram Van Paesschen)
 Best international documentary: Il Castello  (Italy, director: Massimo D'Anolfi & Martina Parenti)
 ConScience award: The Ambassador (Denmark, director: Mads Brügger)

9th edition Docville (May 3–11, 2013)
 Best Belgian documentary: Behind the Redwood Curtain (director: Liesbeth De Ceulaer)
 Best international documentary: The Expedition to the End of the World (Denmark, director: Daniel Dencik)
 ConScience award: A River Changes Course (USA, Cambodia, director: Kalyanee Mam)

10th edition Docville (May 2–10, 2014)
 Best Belgian documentary: What about Eric (director: Lennart Stuyck and Ruben Vermeersch)
 Best international documentary: Happiness (France, Finland, director: Thomas Balmès)
 ConScience award: Virunga (UK, director: Orlando von Einsiedel)

11th edition Docville (May 1–9, 2015)
 Best Belgian documentary: Twilight of a life (director: Sylvain Biegeleisen)
 Best international documentary:Garnet's Gold (UK, director: Ed Perkins)
 ConScience Award: Democrats (Denmark, director: Camilla Nielsson)
 Best Flemish TV documentary: De Werkende Mens (Director: Lode Desmet)
 Knack Audience Award:The Man Who Saved The World (Denmark, director: Peter Anthony)

12th edition Docville (April 29-May 7, 2016)
 Best Belgian documentary: Reach for the Sky (Director: Steven Dhoedt)
 Best international documentary: Life, Animated (USA, director: Roger Ross Williams)
 ConScience Award: This Changes Everything (Canada, director: Avi Lewis)
 Best Flemish TV documentary: Spul (Director: Jan Antonissen en Guillaume Graux)
 Knack Audience Award:Life, Animated (USA, director: Roger Ross Williams)

13th edition Docville (22-30 March 2017)
 Best Belgian documentary: Burning Out (director: Jérôme Le Maire)
 Best International documentary: School Life (Ireland, director: Neasa Ní Chianáin and David Rane)
 ConScience award: City of Ghosts (USA, director: Matthew Heineman)
 Best Flemish TV-documentary: Steenweg (Acht, production: Zonderlin)
 Knack Audience Award: Magnus (USA, director: Benjamin Ree)

14th edition Docville (21-29 March 2018)
 Best Belgian documentary: Zie Mij Doen (Watch Me) (director: Klara Van Es)
 Best International documentary: Piripkura (Brasil, director: Renata Terra, Bruno Jorge, Mariana Oliva)
 ConScience Award: The Deminer (Sweden, director: Matthew Hogir Hirori)
 Audience Award: Doof Kind (Deaf Child) (The Netherlands, director: Alex de Ronde)

15th edition Docville (27 March- 4 April 2019)
 Best Belgian documentary: Sakawa (director: Ben Asamoah)
 Best International documentary: Heartbound (Denmark, director: Janus Metz, Sine Plambech)
 ConScience Award: One Child Nation (USA, director: Nanfu Wang, Jialing Zhang)
 Audience Award: Free Solo (USA, director: Jimmy Chin, Elizabeth Chai Vasarhelyi)

16th edition Docville (25 September - 3 October 2020)
 Best Belgian documentary: Victoria (director: Liesbeth De Ceulaer, Sofie Benoot en Isabelle Tollenaere)
 Best International documentary: The Painter and the Thief (Norway, director: Benjamin Ree)
 ConScience Award: Collective (Romania, director: Alexander Nanau)
 Audience Award: The Cave (director: Feras Fayyad)

17th edition Docville (9 - 19 June 2021)
 Best Belgian documentary: Holgut (director: Liesbeth De Ceulaer)
 Best International documentary: Some Kind of Heaven (USA, director: Lance Oppenheim)
 ConScience Award: President (Denmark, Norway, director: Camilla Nielsson)
 Audience Award: The Jump (Lithuania, director: Giedre Zickyte)

18th edition Docville (23-31 March 2022)
 Best Belgian documentary: Juste un Mouvement (director: Vincent Meessen)
 Best International documentary: Trenches (France, director: Loup Bureau)
 ConScience Award: Jason (The Netherlands, director: Maasja Ooms)
 Audience Award: Duty of Care (Belgium, director: Nic Balthazar)

Special Guests/activities 

 In 2012 British documentary film maker Louis Theroux held a masterclass at the festival
 In 2014 Canadian filmmaker Jennifer Baichwal  introduced her newest documentary, Watermark.  As well as Freda Kelly, former secretary of The Beatles and the subject of Good Ol' Freda. Austrian documentary film maker Erwin Wagenhofer will be presenting his newest film, Alphabet as well as giving a masterclass during the festival.
 In 2016 British documentary film maker Louis Theroux presented his first feature-length documentary My Scientology Movie in European premiere.

External links 
 
 Academy Awards - Documentary Feature Qualifying Festival List

References

Documentary film festivals in Belgium
Film festivals in Belgium
Spring (season) events in Belgium